Timeline of history of Rajasthan
4500-3200 BC: Mesolithic site of Bagor 
3000-2000 BC: Chalcolithic culture of Ganeshwar, Balathal and Ahar
2600 BC: Mature Harappan phase of the Indus Valley civilization begins covering the city of Kalibangan
700-300 BC: Matsya Kingdom, one of the sixteen Mahajanpadas, its capital was Viratnagar, modern day Bairat
300 BC- 300 AD: Period of small Republics and Kingdoms like Malava, Shivi, Arjunayana, Yaudheya etc.
7th century AD: Chavda dynasty establish its rule in south Rajasthan with its capital at Bhinmal.
700 AD Chinese traveler visits a few cities in Rajasthan
725 AD: Bappa Rawal defeats Arabs and captures the Chittor Fort from them.
728 AD: Bappa Rawal establish Mewar dynastry at Chittor Garh
720s AD: Ajayraja II of Chauhan dynasty established City of Ajmer.
738 AD: Nagabhata I, the founder of Pratihar dynasty defeated an Arab army.
971 AD: Vigraharaja II sits on the throne of Shakambhari
1018 Mahmud Ghazni attacks
1031 Vimalshah constructs Dilwara temple
1113 Ajay raj II shifted his capital to Ajaymeru(Ajmer) from Shakambhari
1137 Kachwaha set up Dhundhar 
1156 Rao Jaisal Singh establishes Jaisalmer state
1178 Muhammad Ghori defeated in Battle of Kashadra near Mount Abu by Chaulukyas (Solanki) of Gujarat with the help of Chauhans of Nadol, Jalore and Parmaras of Chandravati.
1191 First Battle of Tarain, Prithviraj Chauhan defeats Muhammad Ghori
1192: Defeat of Rajputs Under Prithviraj in Taraori leading to large scale destruction of their powers.
1230 Tejpal and Vastupal build Neminath temples at Dilwara
1234 Rawal Jait Singh of Mewar defeats Iltutmish
1301 Alauddin Khalji captures Ranthambhor defeating Hammirdeva
1303 Chittorgarh falls to Khilji, Rani Padmini's Jauhar
1311 Khilji defeats Kanhadadeva and captures Jalore
1326 Rana Hammir re takes Chittorgarh
1433 Maharana Kumbha becomes king
1439 Maharana Kumbha build Vijay Stambha
1459 Rao Jodha founded Jodhpur 
1465 Rao Bika set up Bikaner 
1517 Rana Sanga defeated combined Muslim forces of Malwa and Gujarat in Gagron and conquered Malwa (Central India) and made Medini Rai king of Malwa with Chanderi as his capital.
 1519 Rana Sanga defeated Afghans of Ibrahim Lodhi Multiple times and freed most of Present Day Rajasthan.
1527 Coalition of Rajput Prince defeated by Babur in Khanua led by Sanga ending supremacy of Rajputs Sanga established in last 10 years.
1544 Battle at Jaitaran between Raja Maldeo and Sher Shah Suri
1559 Udaipur is founded by Maharana Udaisingh  
1567 Chittor besieged by Akbar
1568 Chittor ravaged by Akbar and placed under the charge of Asaf Khan.
1576 Battle of Haldighati where the Mughal forces defeated Maharana Pratap.
1606 Battle of Dewair, Mughal forces under Asaf Khan was defeated by Maharana Amar Singh.
1727 Sawai Jai Singh II founded city of Jaipur
1733 Maharaja Suraj Mal establishes Jat state at Bharatpur
1818 Many rulers signed treaties with East India Company
1857 first independence movement, Nasirabad
1949 Heera Lal Shastri becomes the chief minister
1956 Rajasthan state reorganised

References

Books

 

 
R
Rajasthan-related lists